Parkal Assembly constituency is a constituency of Telangana Legislative Assembly, India. It is one of 12 constituencies in Warangal district. It is part of Warangal Lok Sabha constituency.

Challa Dharma Reddy is representing the constituency.

Mandals
The Assembly Constituency presently comprises the following Mandals:

Members of Legislative Assembly

Election results

Telangana Legislative Assembly election, 2014

Telangana Legislative Assembly election, 2018

See also
 List of constituencies of Telangana Legislative Assembly

References

Assembly constituencies of Telangana
Hanamkonda district